Novi Grad ("New Town") may refer to:

Places
In Bosnia and Herzegovina:
Novi Grad, Odžak, a village near Odžak in the Federation of Bosnia and Herzegovina
Novi Grad, Republika Srpska, a town and municipality in Republika Srpska
Novi Grad, Sarajevo, a municipality in the city of Sarajevo

In Croatia:
 Novi grad, Osijek, a city district of Osijek

In Serbia:
 Novi Grad, Zemun, an urban neighborhood of Belgrade

In Slovenia:
 Novi Grad, Sevnica, a settlement in the Municipality of Sevnica

Arts and entertainment
 Novi Grad (comics), a location in Marvel Universe

See also
 Novigrad (disambiguation)
 Stari Grad (disambiguation)
 Gornji Grad (disambiguation)
 Donji Grad (disambiguation)
 Grad (toponymy)
 Novo Selo (disambiguation)
 Novo Naselje (disambiguation)